Wardell House is a historic home located at 1 Wardell Rd. in Macon, Macon County, Missouri.  It was built in 1890, and is a three-story, Queen Anne style frame dwelling over a full basement.  It was remodeled between 1899 and 1901.  It has a complex hipped roof line and asymmetrical plan.  It features a full-width verandah and an open tower on the second and third stories.

It was listed on the National Register of Historic Places in 1986.

References

Houses on the National Register of Historic Places in Missouri
Queen Anne architecture in Missouri
Houses completed in 1890
Houses in Macon County, Missouri
National Register of Historic Places in Macon County, Missouri